is an above-ground metro station located in Tsuzuki-ku, Yokohama, Kanagawa Prefecture, Japan, operated by the Yokohama Municipal Subway. It is an interchange station for the Green Line and Blue Line (Line 3).

Lines
Center-Kita Station is served by the Blue Line and Green Line. It is 37.3 kilometers from the terminus of the Blue Line at Shōnandai Station and 5.7 kilometers from the terminus of the Green Line at Nakayama Station.

Station layout
Center-Kita Station has two elevated island platforms serving four tracks.

Platforms

History
Center-Kita Station opened on March 18, 1993 when Line 3 (later named the Blue Line) was extended from Shin-Yokohama Station to Azamino Station. Platform screen doors were installed in April 2007. Services on the Green Line started on March 30, 2008.

Surrounding area
Hankyu Department Store
Yokohama History Museum and Otsuka-Saikachido archeological site

See also
 List of railway stations in Japan

References

External links

 Center-Kita Station (Blue Line) 
 Center-Kita Station (Green Line) 

Railway stations in Kanagawa Prefecture
Railway stations in Japan opened in 1993
Blue Line (Yokohama)
Green Line (Yokohama)